Miriama Senokonoko (born 21 January 1995) is a Fijian athlete. She competed in the women's 400 metres at the 2018 IAAF World Indoor Championships.

References

External links

1995 births
Living people
Fijian female sprinters
Athletes (track and field) at the 2018 Commonwealth Games
Place of birth missing (living people)
Commonwealth Games competitors for Fiji